Karl Mejstrik was an Austrian pair skater. Competing with Helene Engelmann, he became the 1913 World champion and 1914 World silver medalist.

Results

Men's singles

Pairs with Engelmann

References

Navigation

Austrian male pair skaters
World Figure Skating Championships medalists